General elections were held in the Gambia on 26 May 1966. They result was a victory for the ruling People's Progressive Party, which won 24 of the 32 elected seats. Voter turnout was 71.1%.

Results

Of the four seats won by the United Party-Gambia Congress Party coalition, the United Party took three and the Gambia Congress Party one.

References

Gambia
Parliamentary elections in the Gambia
1966 in the Gambia
May 1966 events in Africa
Election and referendum articles with incomplete results